Bikas Pati (born 17 May 1985) is an Indian first-class cricketer who plays for Odisha.

References

External links
 

1985 births
Living people
Indian cricketers
Odisha cricketers
People from Jeypore
Cricketers from Odisha